Kang Yun-mi (born February 11, 1988) is a North Korean artistic gymnast. She is a vault specialist. She is the 2003 World silver medalist on the vault. She represented North Korea at the 2004 Summer Olympics and placed 5th on the vault in event finals. She was one of the few gymnasts to perform the very difficult Amanar vault.

External links
 
 

1988 births
Living people
North Korean female artistic gymnasts
Gymnasts at the 2004 Summer Olympics
Olympic gymnasts of North Korea
Medalists at the World Artistic Gymnastics Championships
21st-century North Korean women